Madurai Municipal Corporation is the civic body which administers the city of Madurai in Tamil Nadu, India. Madurai is one of the oldest living cities in the world. Formed on 1 May 1971 as the first Municipal Corporation in Tamil Nadu post independence, it is the third largest municipal corporation in Tamil Nadu in population and revenue. It is the sixth largest in Tamil Nadu by area after Greater Chennai Corporation, Coimbatore Municipal Corporation, Tirunelveli Municipal Corporation, Tiruchirappalli Municipal Corporation, and Tiruppur Municipal Corporation. The annual budget of Madurai Corporation for 2021-22 is Rs.437 crores. It consists of a Council and an Executive wings. The council is headed by the Mayor while the Executive wing is headed by the Commissioner. It consists of 100 wards organised into five zones, viz East, North, Central, South and West.

History 

The municipality of Madurai was constituted on 1 November 1866 as per the Town Improvement Act of 1865. The municipality was headed by a chairperson and elections were regularly conducted for the post except during the period 1891 to 1896, when no elections were held due to violent factionalism. A Secretary was appointed in 1898 to assist the Municipal Chairperson. A municipal office was established in 1871–1872 in a portion of the Thirumalai Nayak's palace. The municipality repaired a causeway across the Vaigai River in 1884 and founded a maternity hospital in 1873. In 1892, the Madurai municipality commissioned 'Arappalayam Water Works' a water-supply project headed by J. A. Jones, Sanitary Engineer to the Madras government, to construct a channel redirecting the waters of the Vaigai River and purifying them. The project was eventually completed in 1894 at a cost of Rs.6,23,000, including a Rs.1,96,000 grant from the government of Madras Presidency. The cost of maintenance was estimated at Rs.32,753. A drainage system for the portion surrounded by the four Masi streets was completed in 1902.
During the early years of independent India, the Madurai municipality was dominated by reformists of the Indian National Congress. As early as December 1923, the municipality had passed a resolution prohibiting the sale of liquor and intoxicants in Madurai city. Madurai was upgraded to a municipal corporation on 1 May 1971 as per the Madurai City Municipal Corporation Act, 1971. It is the second oldest municipal corporation in Tamil Nadu, after Chennai.

Structure 

The Madurai City Municipal Corporation Council, the legislative body, comprises 100 councilors elected from each of the 100 wards and is headed by a Mayor assisted by a Deputy Mayor. The executive wing is made up of seven departments: general administration, revenue, town planning, engineering, public health, education and finance and accounts and is headed by a City Commissioner. The Commissioner is assisted by a Deputy Commissioner, City Engineer, City Health Officer, City Education Officer, two Executive Engineers, Assistant Commissioners apart from others.

List of Mayors 
 S. Muthu (1971 - 1980)
 S.K.Balakrishnan (1980 - 1982)
 S. Patturajan (1982 - 1984)
 P. Kulandaivelu (1996 - 2001)
 C. Ramachandran (2001 - 2006)
 G. Thenmozhi Gopinathan (2006 - 2011) first women mayor of Madurai
 V. V. Rajan Chellappa (2011 - 2016)
 Indirani Pon Vasanth(2022 - Incumbent)

List of Deputy Mayors 
 K S Shanthanam (1972-1974)
 M. Natarajan (1974-1975)
 S. Navaneetha Krishnan (1980-1982)
 Misa M.Pandian (1996 - 2001)
 D. Chinna Samy (2001 - 2005)
 S. Syed Ghouse Basha (2005 - 2006)
 P.M.Mannan (2006 - 2011)
 R.Gopalakrishnan (2011 - 2014)
 M.Thiraviyam (2014 - 2016)
 T. Nagarajan (2022 - Incumbent)

List of Committee Chairpersons (2022) 

1. Accounts Committee -
2. Education Committee -
3. Public Health Committee -
4. Taxation and Finance Committee -
5. Town Planning and Improvement Committee -
6. Works Committee -

List of Zonal Chairpersons (Wards Committee) (2022) 

1. East Zone -Tmt. S.Vasuki
2. North Zone -Tmt.A.Saravanabhuvaneshwari

3. Central Zone -
4. South Zone -
5. West Zone -

List of Councillors (2022) 

1	Tmt. D.Sharmila
2	Tmt. M.Amutha
3	Thiru. G.Selva Ganapathy
4	Tmt. K.Nandhini
5	Tmt. S.Vasuki
6	Tmt. B.Palselvi
7	Thiru. M.Ramamoorthy
8	Tmt. G.Radhika
9	Thiru. S.Dhanaraj
10	Tmt. A.Muthukumari
11	Thiru. S.Genghis Khan
12	Tmt. M.Ratha
13	Thiru. Senthilkumar
14	Tmt. L.Anthoniammal
15	Tmt. A.Saravana Bhuvaneswari
16	Thiru. D.Jeyaraj
17	Tmt. P.Rohini
18	Thiru. K.E.Navaneetha Krishnan
19	Thiru. P.Babu
20	Tmt. C.Nagajothi
21	Thiru. P.Kajendrakumar
22	Tmt. B.Mahalakshmi
23	Thiru. T.Kumaravel
24	Thiru. J.Manickam
25	Thiru. K.Murali Ganesh
26	Tmt. K.Chokkayee
27	Thiru. A.Mayathevan
28	Tmt. R.Uma
29	Tmt. R.Logamani
30	Tmt. A.Vasanthadevi
31	Thiru. V.Murugan
32	Tmt. M.Vijaya Moushumi
33	Tmt. R.Malathi
34	Tmt. J.Pandeeswari
35	Tmt. S.Janaki
36	Thiru. V.Karthikeyan
37	Thiru. N.Ponnuvalavan
38	Thiru. T.Kathiravan
39	Thiru. P.Marnadu
40	Thiru. C.M.Duraipandian
41	Thiru. K. Senthamarai Kannan
42	Tmt. K.Selvi
43	Thiru. M.Mugesh Sharma
44	Tmt. K.Tamilselvi
45	Tmt. K.Shanmugavalli
46	Tmt. P.Vijayalakshmi
47	Tmt. M.Banu
48	Tmt. K.Rubinikumar
49	Thiru. A.Syed Abuthahir
50	Tmt. R.Indiragandhi
51	Tmt. K.Vijayalakshmi
52	Thiru. S.Baskaran
53	Thiru. S.Arunkumar
54	Tmt. I. Noorjahan
55	Tmt. G.Vijaya
56	Tmt. V.Jenniammal
57	Tmt. V.Indirani
58	Thiru. M.Jeyaram
59	Tmt. A.Mahalakshmi
60	Tmt. S.Bama
61	Tmt. S.Selvi
62	Thiru. K.Jayachandran
63	Thiru. R.Krishnamoorthy
64	Thiru. M.Raja
65	Thiru. M.Solai Senthil Kumar
66	Thiru. N.Marimuthu
67	Thiru. D.C.Naganathan
68	Thiru. J.Moovendran
69	Tmt. A.Saraswathy
70	Tmt. T.Amutha
71	Thiru. V.Muniyandi
72	Thiru. P.Karuppusamy
73	Thiru. S.S Bose
74	Thiru. V.Sudhan
75	Tmt. P.Pandi Selvi
76	Thiru. R.Karthick
77	Thiru. D.Raj Prathaban
78	Tmt. P.Tamilselvi
79	Tmt. V.Lakshikka Sree
80	Thiru. T.Nagarajan
81	Thiru. S.V.Murugan
82	Thiru. G.Kaveri
83	Thiru. T.Ravi
84	Thiru. Bose Muthiah
85	Tmt. J.Muthumari
86	Tmt. S.Booma
87	Thiru. J.Kalidoss
88	Tmt. M.Prema
89	Tmt. S.Kavitha
90	Thiru. G.Rajarathinam
91	Thiru. K.A.Vasu
92	Thiru. M.Karuppasamy
93	Thiru M.P.R Ravichandran
94	Tmt R.Swetha Sathyan 
95	Tmt K.Indira Gandhi
96	Tmt N.Vijaya
97	Tmt R.Sivasakthi
98	Tmt V.Suvitha
99	Thiru M.Siva
100	Tmt. A.Muthulakshmi

List of Councillors (Past) 
 Mr.K.P.Sasikumar.M.Com., (2011-2016) - Ward-49
 Pazahakkadai. M.Pandi (1971 - 1984)
 S.Syed Ismail Sahib (1971 - 1976)
 Moulvi. Dr. A.S. Afsar Hussain Misbahi (1978 - 1984)
 S. Alagarsamy naidu (1978 - 1984) - Father of Vijayakanth
 S.Thajutheen (1978 - 1984)
 M.C.Kamal (1978 - 1984)
 M.R.Manikkam (1996 - 2011)
 S.D.Jayabalan (1996 - 2016)
 M.Dharmalingam (1996 -2006)
 P. Salaimuthu (2001 - 2016)
 K.M. Chinnu (1978 - 1984)
 Siluvai

Notes

References

External links
 http://203.101.40.168/newmducorp/testbirth.aspx
 Policy Note 2021-22 

Municipal corporations in Tamil Nadu
Government of Madurai
1866 establishments in British India